White Lotus Day is a celebration of Theosophists. It is celebrated 8 May, the anniversary of the death of Helena Petrovna Blavatsky, founder of the Theosophical Society. Though there are several theosophical organisations, this is one celebration they have in common.

White Lotus Day is a celebration that encourages meditation about the metaphor of the lotus. The lotus is born under the mud, growing through the water to achieve the surface, and therefore the air and the light of sun.
This growth is identified with man's life, born in earth but desiring the elevation to the air; representing his middle stage between animals and the ultimate reality. The seeds of lotus contain (even before they germinate) perfectly formed leaves, a miniature shape of what they would become.
This flower is often present in eastern religions, which influence is key in the Theosophical Movement.

Lotus (Gr.). A most occult plant, sacred in Egypt, India and elsewhere; called “the child of the Universe bearing the likeness of its mother in its bosom”. There was a time “when the world was a golden lotus” (padma) says the allegory. A great variety of these plants, from the majestic Indian lotus, down to the marsh-lotus (bird’s foot trefoil) and the Grecian “Dioscoridis”, is eaten at Crete and other islands. It is a species of nymphala, first introduced from India to Egypt to which it was-not indigenous. See the text of Archaic Symbolism in the Appendix Viii. “The Lotus, as a Universal Symbol”.

Explanation
White Lotus Day
In her will, HPB suggested that her friends might gather together on the anniversary of her death (May 8, 1891) and read from Sir Edwin Arnold's The Light of Asia and from The Bhagavad Gita. Lotuses grew in unusual profusion one year later. Hence, May 8 became known as White Lotus Day.
ONE of the symbolic figures for the Dual creative power in Nature (matter and force on the material plane) is Padma, the water lily of India. The Lotus is the product of heat (fire) and water (vapour or Ether); fire standing in every philosophical and religious system as a representation of the Spirit of Deity, the active, male, generative principle; and Ether, or the Soul of matter, the light of the fire, for the receptive female principle from which everything in this Universe emanated. Hence, Ether or Water is the Mother, and Fire is the Father. Sir W. Jones (and before him archaic botany) showed that the seeds of the Lotus contain — even before they germinate — perfectly formed leaves, the miniature shape of what one day, as perfect plants, they will become: nature thus giving us a specimen of the preformation of its production ...the seed of all phanerogamous plants bearing proper flowers containing an embryo plantlet ready formed.

The Lotus, or Padma, is, moreover, a very ancient and favourite simile for the Kosmos itself, and also for man. The popular reasons given are, firstly, the fact just mentioned, that the Lotus-seed contains within itself a perfect miniature of the future plant, which typifies the fact that the spiritual prototypes of all things materialised on Earth. Secondly, the fact that the Lotus plant grows up through the water, having its root in the Ilus, or mud, and spreading its flower in the air above. The Lotus thus typifies the life of man and also that of the Kosmos; for the Secret Doctrine teaches that the elements of both are the same, and that both are developing in the same direction. The root of the Lotus sunk in the mud represents material life, the stalk passing up through the water typifies existence in the astral world, and the flower floating on the water and opening to the sky is emblematical of spiritual being. (The Secret Doctrine I, 57-58.)

More explanation
STANZA II. — Continued.

3.  THE HOUR HAD NOT YET STRUCK; THE RAY HAD NOT YET FLASHED INTO THE GERM (a); THE MATRI-PADMA (mother lotus) HAD NOT YET SWOLLEN (b).*

(a) The ray of the “Ever Darkness” becomes, as it is emitted, a ray of effulgent light or life, and flashes into the “Germ” — the point in the Mundane Egg, represented by matter in its abstract sense.  But the term “Point” must not be understood as applying to any particular point in Space, for a germ exists in the centre of every atom, and these collectively form “the Germ;” or rather, as no atom can be made visible to our physical eye, the collectivity of these (if the term can be applied to something which is boundless and infinite) forms the noumenon of eternal and indestructible matter.

(b) One of the symbolical figures for the Dual creative power in Nature (matter and force on the material plane) is Padma, the water-lily of India.  The Lotus is the product of heat (fire) and water (vapour or Ether); fire standing in every philosophical and religious system as a representation of the Spirit of Deity,† the active, male, generative principle; and Ether, or the Soul of matter, the light of the fire, for the receptive female principle from which everything in this Universe emanated.  Hence, Ether or Water is the Mother, and Fire is the Father.  Sir W. Jones (and before him archaic botany) showed that the seeds of the Lotus contain — even before they germinate — perfectly formed leaves, the miniature shape of what one day, as perfect plants, they will become:  nature thus giving us a specimen of the preformation of its production . . . the seed of all phanerogamous plants bearing proper flowers containing an embryo plantlet ready formed.‡ (See Part II., “The Lotus Flower as a Universal Symbol.”) This explains the sentence “The Mother had not yet swollen” — the form being usually sacrificed to the inner or root idea in Archaic symbology.

The Lotus, or Padma, is, moreover, a very ancient and favourite simile for the Kosmos itself, and also for man.  The popular reasons given are, firstly, the fact just mentioned, that the Lotus-seed contains within itself a perfect miniature of the future plant, which typifies the fact that the spiritual prototypes of all things exist in the immaterial world before those things become materialised on Earth.  Secondly, the fact that the Lotus plant grows up through the water, having its root in the Ilus, or mud, and spreading its flower in the air above.  The Lotus thus typifies the life of man and also that of the Kosmos; for the Secret Doctrine teaches that the elements of both are the same, and that both are developing in the same direction.  The root of the Lotus sunk in the mud represents material life, the stalk passing up through the water typifies existence in the astral world, and the flower floating on the water and opening to the sky is emblematical of spiritual being.
—————
 An unpoetical term, yet still very graphic.  (See foot-note to Stanza III.)
† Even in Christianity.  (See Part II., “Primordial Substance and Divine Thought.”)
‡ Gross, “The Heathen Religion”, p. 195.
—————

References

External links
 Extraction of Theosophy, Vol. 89, Issue 4, May/June 2001 (pp. 165–166), where the White Lotus Day purpose is explained.

Theosophy
Religious holidays
May observances